Spirembolus vallicolens is a species of sheet weaver found in North America. It was described by Chamberlin in 1920.

References

Linyphiidae
Spiders of North America
Spiders described in 1920